RER E is one of the five lines in the Réseau Express Régional (English: Regional Express Network), a hybrid commuter rail and rapid transit system serving Paris, France and its suburbs. The  RER E line travels between Paris and eastern suburbs, with all trains serving the stations in central Paris, before branching out towards the ends of the line.

The line runs from the western terminus Haussmann–Saint-Lazare (E1) to the eastern termini Chelles–Gournay (E2) and Tournan (E4). It is operated by SNCF.

Originally referred to as the Est Ouest Liaison Express or EOLE (English: East West Express Link), RER E is the newest line in the system opening in 1999, with the extension in 2003, and further extensions to the west currently under construction (in 2024 to Nanterre-La Folie, in 2026 to Mantes-la-Jolie).

History

RER E opened on 14 July 1999 between Haussmann – Saint-Lazare and Chelles–Gournay. The construction included a  tunnel between Haussmann – St-Lazare and Magenta (which serves Gare de l'Est and Gare du Nord).

The line was first extended with a new branch from Noisy-le-Sec to Villiers-sur-Marne – Le Plessis-Trévise on 30 August 1999. This branch was extended to Tournan on 14 December 2003.

On 13 December 2015, Rosa-Parks station opened in the 19th arrondissement of Paris.

Extension

RER E is to be extended from Haussmann – Saint-Lazare to La Défense, from where it will take over the branch of RER A to Nanterre, Sartrouville and Poissy. It would then take over a section of SNCF tracks (currently carrying Transilien J) to reach Mantes-la-Jolie. Partial revenue service, from Haussmann - Saint-Lazare to Nanterre - La Folie, was expected to begin by the end of 2022, then full service in 2024., but has since been delayed to 2024 and 2026, respectively.

An  tunnel will be dug between Haussmann–St-Lazare and La Défense. An intermediate station at Porte Maillot will offer a transfer to RER C. The extension is expected to reduce the load on central sections of RER B (between Gare du Nord and Châtelet) and RER A (between La Défense and Auber) by 10-15%. Additionally, transfers will be shifted away from current transfer hub Châtelet in the city center.

List of RER E stations

Map

Operation

Names of services
Like all the other RER lines, each train is named after the route it takes. The first letter designates the destination, the second indicates whether the train will call at every station or not.
 T corresponds to Tournan; V corresponds to Villiers-sur-Marne,
 C corresponds to Chelles–Gournay,
 H corresponds to Haussmann–Saint-Lazare.

Regular names of services of trains departing from Paris are, among others, TAVA (stops at Magenta, Rosa Parks, Pantin, Noisy-le-Sec, Val de Fontenay, and all stations from Villiers-sur-Marne to Tournan), VOHE (stops at every station, all the way to Villiers-sur-Marne), COHI (stops at every station all the way to Chelles–Gournay).

See also
 List of Paris Métro stations
 List of RER stations

Rolling stock

Current fleet

References

External links

English 
 RATP's English-language website
 RATP's interactive map of the RER
 RATP's interactive map of the Paris métro

French 
 RATP official website
 Mobidf website, dedicated to the RER (unofficial) 
 Metro-Pole website, dedicated to Paris public transports (unofficial)

E, RER E
Railway lines opened in 1999
1999 establishments in France